Au Trianon is a restaurant owned by celebrity chef Gordon Ramsay that serves French cuisine. The restaurant is located in Paris, France. It holds one mechelin star and was founded in 1910. The head chef of the restaurant is Frederic Larquemin since November 2016. He began his career at Comte de Gascogne.

Description 
The restaurant is situated in the Trianon Palace, not too far from the Versailles palace. Gordon Ramsay owns and runs the restaurant, and it is said that Ramsay's other restaurant in London inspired the Gordon Ramsay au Trianon restaurant.

Menu 

The restaurant has a 5 to 7-course menu, which includes modern French cuisine. Items in the menu include mallard duck, venison tartare, herbs sorbet, berlingtons, chestnut, carnaroli risotto, scallop, cheese, wine pairings and shortbread. The restaurant has a section known as the 'Chefs table', in which customers can spectate chefs at work in a dynamic kitchen.

See also 
Restaurant Gordon Ramsay
Le Pressoir d'Argent
Pétrus (restaurant)
Gordon Ramsay Hell's Kitchen
List of restaurants owned or operated by Gordon Ramsay

References

External links 

Gordonramsayrestaurants.com/au-trianon